The border between Norway and Finland is  long. It is a land and river border between two tripoints. The western tripoint is marked by Treriksröset, a concrete cairn where both countries border Sweden. The eastern tripoint is marked by Treriksrøysa, a stone cairn where both countries border Russia.

The border was defined in a treaty from 1751, but was then a part of the border between the Kingdom of Sweden, ruling Finland, and Denmark-Norway. In the period 1738-1751 there were field investigations and negotiations on the border, although the Finnish part needed less negotiation. Cairns were erected after that with the last one at Nesseby in 1766. After Finland became the Grand Duchy of Finland, a Grand Duchy of the Russian Empire, and the independent Kingdom of Norway was evoked into but in personal union with Sweden under the Swedish King, a treaty was again negotiated in 1816 with Russia. Defining the easternmost part of the borderzone. Between 1920 and 1944, the Petsamo area belonged to Finland, so the Finland–Norway border extended along the present Norway–Russia border to the ocean. The 1751 treaty also granted the Sami people the right to cross the border freely, including their reindeer, as they always had done. In 1852, the border of Norway–Finland/Russia was closed, causing trouble for the Sami, who needed the Finnish forests for reindeer winter grazing.

The Finland–Norway border is open as both countries are part of the Schengen Area. It is legal to cross the border anywhere if no customs declaration or passport check is needed. A treaty gives the customs officers of one country the right to carry out clearance and checks for both countries. Almost half of the border follows the rivers Anarjohka and Tana. A fairly large share of the western part of the border goes over treeless mountains. There are 57 original cairns north of Treriksröset from until 1766, numbered 293-342 west of Anarjohka river and 343-349 east of Tana river. Later further cairns numbered 343–353 against Finland were erected east of Nesseby, and cairns in between the originals with a letter after the number.

The extreme eastern end of Norway (containing the town of Kirkenes) actually reaches east of Finland, located between Finland and Russia. Since Norway uses Central European Time and Finland uses Eastern European Time, the time zone on the east side of the border is one hour behind the time zone on the west side.

List of road border crossings

From east to west:
 Neiden (road 92), N
 Polmak (road 970/895), N
 Utsjoki  (road E75), F
 Karigasniemi (road 92), F
 Kivilompolo (road E45), F
 Helligskogen (road E8), N

N = customs station on the Norwegian side
F = customs station on the Finnish side
All road crossings on this border have customs stations.

See also
Finnish Border Guard
Norwegian Police Service

References

 
European Union external borders
1751 establishments in Finland
1751 establishments in Norway
1751 in international relations
Norway
Borders of Norway
International borders